Gary Robert Shaw (born 21 January 1961) is an English former football striker who played for Aston Villa in the early 1980s.

Club career
During the 1980s, Shaw's goals helped Aston Villa win the First Division championship in 1980–81 and the European Cup the following year - the only Birmingham-born player in the team. In 1981, he was voted PFA Young Player of the Year, and was awarded the Bravo Award the following year, as the best under-23 player in European Competitions.

His promising Villa career was effectively ended after sustaining a knee injury in an away game at Nottingham Forest in September 1983. After a heavy tackle, he was helped to his feet by Ian Bowyer and, in Shaw's words, something in his knee 'clicked'. After his recovery, he continued to play for Villa until the conclusion of the 1987–88 season.

In July 1988 he made his debut for Copenhagen-based Kjøbenhavns Boldklub in Denmark, moving to SK Austria Klagenfurt in Austria in 1989. He finished his career off at Walsall, Kilmarnock, Shrewsbury Town and the Hong Kong-based Ernest Borel FC.

International career
Shaw gained seven caps for the England under-21 team. Following a successful European Cup campaign with Aston Villa, he was also included in the 40-strong preliminary England squad for the 1982 FIFA World Cup finals; however, he was not picked in the final 22.

Honours

Club 
Aston Villa
 First Division: 1980–81
 European Cup: 1981–82
 European Super Cup: 1982

Individual 
 Bravo Award (Awarded to the Most Outstanding Young Footballer in Europe): 1982
 PFA Young Player of the Year: 1981
 PFA Team of the Year: 1980–81

References

External links
 
 Player profile at Aston Villa Player Database
 Photo

1961 births
Living people
Footballers from Birmingham, West Midlands
English footballers
England under-21 international footballers
Association football forwards
Aston Villa F.C. players
Blackpool F.C. players
Kjøbenhavns Boldklub players
FC Kärnten players
Walsall F.C. players
Kilmarnock F.C. players
Shrewsbury Town F.C. players
Sea Bee players
English Football League players
Scottish Football League players
English expatriate footballers
Expatriate footballers in Hong Kong
Expatriate men's footballers in Denmark
Expatriate footballers in Austria